Dufek may refer to:
 3781 Dufek, a minor planet named after George Dufek
 Dufek Coast in Antarctica, named after U.S. Rear Admiral George J. Dufek
 Dufek Head, a headland in Antarctica
 Dufek Massif in the Pensacola Mountains of Antarctica
 Dufek Mountain in Antarctica

People 
 Don Dufek (born 1954), an American football player
 Don Dufek, Sr. (1929–2014), an American football player
 George J. Dufek (1903–1977), a U.S. Rear Admiral
 Jan Dufek (born 1997), a Czech ice hockey player
 Joe Dufek (born 1961), an American football quarterback
 Karel Dufek (1916–2009), a Czechoslovak diplomat 
 Milan Dufek (1944–2005), a Czech singer and musician